Eskdale is an unincorporated community and coal town in Kanawha County, West Virginia, United States. Eskdale has a post office with ZIP code 25075.

References

Unincorporated communities in Kanawha County, West Virginia
Unincorporated communities in West Virginia
Coal towns in West Virginia